Robyn Michelle Maddox Brody (born February 13, 1970) is a justice of the Idaho Supreme Court, a member since 2017. Elected to an open seat in November 2016, she is the third woman to serve on the state's highest court, and the first elected rather than appointed by the governor.

Prior to her election, Brody was in private practice for nineteen years in south central Idaho, in Twin Falls

Early years
Brody was born on February 13, 1970, in Wayne, Michigan, Brody's parents worked for United Airlines, her father as a ramp agent and her mother in kitchen  When Brody was 12, her family relocated to Denver, Colorado, and after graduation from high school in 1988, she accepted a scholarship at the University of Denver. Brody earned a bachelor's degree in international and Russian studies in 1992.

Career
After graduating, Brody traveled to Russia and spent a year in Saint Petersburg, teaching tenth grade English and studying Russian. She returned to Denver in 1993 and entered Sturm College of Law in a dual-degree program in law (J.D.) and international management, graduating in 1997.

Brody joined a private firm in Twin Falls and stayed for thirteen years, the last ten as a partner. She left the firm in 2010 to begin her own firm in Rupert, where she and her family had moved.

Election
Following Chief Justice Jim Jones' retirement announcement in March 2016, Brody entered the election race for the high court's open seat. She finished first in the field of four in May with 30.3%, and won the run-off in November over state senator Curt McKenzie of Nampa, with 53.8% of the vote.

On January 5, 2017, Brody was sworn into office by retired Chief Justice Linda Copple Trout, the first woman to serve on the court, from 1992 to 2007.  She ran unopposed in May 2022 for her second term.

Personal
Brody's husband is Jonathan P. Brody, a district judge in Rupert since 2010. Also a graduate of the University of Denver, he received his law degree from the University of Colorado. Married  in 1997, the couple has two sons.

References

External links
Idaho Supreme Court – Hon. Robyn M. Brody
Brody for Supreme Court – campaign site

1970 births
Living people
Justices of the Idaho Supreme Court
People from Denver
People from Twin Falls, Idaho
People from Rupert, Idaho
Sturm College of Law alumni
People from Wayne, Michigan
21st-century American judges
21st-century American women judges